This is a list of chapters of the Alpha Delta Phi Fraternity. Active chapters are noted in bold; inactive chapters are noted in italic.

Notes

See also

References 

Alpha Delta Phi
chapters